Coppicing is a traditional method of woodland management which exploits the capacity of many species of trees to put out new shoots from their stump or roots if cut down. In a coppiced wood, which is called a copse, young tree stems are repeatedly cut down to near ground level, resulting in a stool. New growth emerges, and after a number of years, the coppiced tree is harvested, and the cycle begins anew. Pollarding is a similar process carried out at a higher level on the tree in order to prevent grazing animals from eating new shoots. Daisugi (台杉, where sugi refers to Japanese cedar), is a similar Japanese technique.

Many silviculture practices involve cutting and regrowth; coppicing has been of significance in many parts of lowland temperate Europe. The widespread and long-term practice of coppicing as a landscape-scale industry is something that remains of special importance in southern England. Many of the English language terms referenced in this article are particularly relevant to historic and contemporary practice in that area.

Typically a coppiced woodland is harvested in sections or coups on a rotation. In this way, a crop is available each year somewhere in the woodland. Coppicing has the effect of providing a rich variety of habitats, as the woodland always has a range of different-aged coppice growing in it, which is beneficial for biodiversity. The cycle length depends upon the species cut, the local custom, and the use of the product. Birch can be coppiced for faggots on a three- or four-year cycle, whereas oak can be coppiced over a fifty-year cycle for poles or firewood.

Trees being coppiced do not die of old age as coppicing maintains the tree at a juvenile stage, allowing them to reach immense ages.

History 
Evidence suggests that coppicing has been continuously practised since pre-history. Coppiced stems are characteristically curved at the base. This curve occurs as the competing stems grow out from the stool in the early stages of the cycle, then up toward the sky as the canopy closes. The curve may allow the identification of coppice timber in archaeological sites. Timber in the Sweet Track in Somerset (built in the winter of 3807 and 3806 BCE) has been identified as coppiced Tilia species.

Originally, the silvicultural system now called coppicing was practiced solely for small wood production. In German this is called Niederwald, which translates as low forest. Later on in Mediaeval times, farmers encouraged pigs to feed from acorns, and so some trees were allowed to grow bigger. This different silvicultural system is called in English coppice with standards. In German this is called Mittelwald (middle forest). As modern forestry (Hochwald in German, which translates as High forest) seeks to harvest timber mechanically, and pigs are generally no longer fed from acorns, both systems have declined. However, there are cultural and wildlife benefits from these two silvicultural systems, so both can be found where timber production or some other main forestry purpose (such as a protection forest against an avalanche) is not the sole management objective of the woodland.

In the 16th and 17th centuries, the technology of charcoal iron production became widely established in England, continuing in some areas until the late 19th century Along with the growing need for oak bark for tanning, this required large amounts of coppice wood. With this coppice management, wood could be provided for those growing industries in principle indefinitely. This was regulated by a statute of 1544 of Henry VIII, which required woods to be enclosed after cutting (to prevent browsing by animals) and 12 standels (standards or mature uncut trees) to be left in each acre, to be grown into timber. Coppice with standards (scattered individual stems allowed to grow on through several coppice cycles) has been commonly used throughout most of Europe as a means of giving greater flexibility in the resulting forest product from any one area. The woodland provides the small material from the coppice as well as a range of larger timber for such uses as house building, bridge repair, cart-making and so on.

In the 18th century coppicing in Britain began a long decline. This was brought about by the erosion of its traditional markets. Firewood was no longer needed for domestic or industrial uses as coal and coke became easily obtained and transported, and wood as a construction material was gradually replaced by newer materials. Coppicing died out first in the north of Britain and steadily contracted toward the south-east until by the 1960s active commercial coppice was heavily concentrated in Kent and Sussex.

Practice 
The shoots (or suckers) may be used either in their young state for interweaving in wattle fencing (as is the practice with coppiced willows and hazel), or the new shoots may be allowed to grow into large poles, as was often the custom with trees such as oaks or ashes. This creates long, straight poles which do not have the bends and forks of naturally grown trees. Coppicing may be practised to encourage specific growth patterns, as with cinnamon trees which are grown for their bark.

Another, more complicated system is called compound coppice. Here some of the standards would be left, some harvested. Some of the coppice would be allowed to grow into new standards and some regenerated coppice would be there. Thus there would be three age classes. Coppiced hardwoods were used extensively in carriage and shipbuilding, and they are still sometimes grown for making wooden buildings and furniture.

Withies for wicker-work are grown in coppices of various willow species, principally osier.

In France, sweet chestnut trees are coppiced for use as canes and bâtons for the martial art Canne de combat (also known as Bâton français).

Some Eucalyptus species are coppiced in a number of countries, including Australia, North America, Uganda, and Sudan.

The Sal tree is coppiced in India, and the Moringa oleifera tree is coppiced in many countries, including India.

Sometimes former coppice is converted to high-forest woodland by the practice of singling. All but one of the regrowing stems are cut, leaving the remaining one to grow as if it were a maiden (uncut) tree.

The boundaries of coppice coups were sometimes marked by cutting certain trees as pollards or stubs.

United Kingdom 

In southern Britain, coppice was traditionally hazel, hornbeam, field maple, ash, sweet chestnut, occasionally sallow, elm, small-leafed lime and rarely oak or beech, grown among pedunculate or sessile oak, ash or beech standards. In wet areas alder and willows were used.

Coppices provided wood for many purposes, especially charcoal before coal was economically significant in metal smelting. A minority of these woods are still operated for coppice today, often by conservation organisations, producing material for hurdle-making, thatching spars, local charcoal-burning or other crafts. The only remaining large-scale commercial coppice crop in England is sweet chestnut which is grown in parts of Sussex and Kent. Much of this was established as plantations in the 19th century for hop-pole production (hop-poles are used to support the hop plant while growing hops) and is nowadays cut on a 12 to 18-year cycle for splitting and binding into cleft chestnut paling fence, or on a 20- to 35-year cycle for cleft post-and-rail fencing, or for sawing into small lengths to be finger-jointed for architectural use. Other material goes to make farm fencing and to be chipped for modern wood-fired heating systems.

In northwest England, coppice-with-standards has been the norm, the standards often of oak with relatively little simple coppice. After World War II, a great deal was planted up with conifers or became neglected. Coppice-working almost died out, though a few men continued in the woods. A small, and growing, number of people make a living wholly or partly by working coppices in the area today, at places such as at the Weald and Downland Living Museum.

Wildlife 

Coppice management favours a range of wildlife, often of species adapted to open woodland. After cutting, the increased light allows existing woodland-floor vegetation such as bluebell, anemone and primrose to grow vigorously. Often brambles grow around the stools, encouraging insects, or various small mammals that can use the brambles as protection from larger predators. Woodpiles (if left in the coppice) encourage insects such as beetles to come into an area. The open area is then colonised by many animals such as nightingale, European nightjar and fritillary butterflies. As the coup grows, the canopy closes and it becomes unsuitable for these animals againbut in an actively managed coppice there is always another recently cut coup nearby, and the populations therefore move around, following the coppice management.

However, most British coppices have not been managed in this way for many decades. The coppice stems have grown tall (the coppice is said to be overstood), forming a heavily shaded woodland of many closely spaced stems with little ground vegetation. The open-woodland animals survive in small numbers along woodland rides or not at all, and many of these once-common species have become rare. Overstood coppice is a habitat of relatively low biodiversityit does not support the open-woodland species, but neither does it support many of the characteristic species of high forest, because it lacks many high-forest features such as substantial dead-wood, clearings and stems of varied ages. Suitable conservation management of these abandoned coppices may be to restart coppice management, or in some cases it may be more appropriate to use singling and selective clearance to establish a high-forest structure.

Natural occurrence 
Coppice and pollard growth is a response of the tree to damage, and can occur naturally. Trees may be browsed or broken by large herbivorous animals, such as cattle or elephants, felled by beavers or blown over by the wind. Some trees, such as linden, may produce a line of coppice shoots from a fallen trunk, and sometimes these develop into a line of mature trees. For some trees, such as the common beech (Fagus sylvatica), coppicing is more or less easy depending on the altitude: it is much more efficient for trees in the montane zone.

For energy wood 
Coppicing of willow, alder and poplar for energy wood has proven commercially successful. The Willow Biomass Project in the United States is an example of this. In this case the coppicing is done in a way that an annual or more likely a tri-annual cut can happen. This seems to maximize the production volume from the stand. Such frequent growth means the soils can be easily depleted and so fertilizers are often required. The stock also becomes exhausted after some years and so will be replaced with new plants. The method of harvesting of energy wood can be mechanized by adaptation of specialized agricultural machinery.

Species and cultivars vary in when they should be cut, regeneration times and other factors. However, full life cycle analysis has shown that poplars have a lower effect in greenhouse gas emissions for energy production than alternatives.

Gallery

See also 

 Ancient woodland
 Apical dominance
 Basal shoot
 Bodging
 Coarse woody debris
 Crown sprouting
 Epicormic shoot
 Even aged timber management
 Fire ecology
 Layering
 Lignotuber
 Mallee (habit)
 Pollarding
 Pruning
 Fruit tree pruning
 Short rotation coppice
 Shredding (tree pruning technique)
 Silvopasture
 Stand level modelling
 Thinning
 Tree topping

References

Further reading 
 
 Hammersley, G, 'The charcoal iron industry and its fuel 1540–1750' Econ Hist. Rev. Ser. II, 26 (1973), 593–613.

External links 

Forest management
Habitat management equipment and methods
Horticultural techniques
Habitat
Trees
Wildfire ecology